Forests Monitor is a non-governmental organization that was established in Cambridge, England, in 1993, to support forest-dependent people and raise public awareness about the negative impact that industrial forest exploitation has on the people that live in these forests and on the ecosystems that support them, including the wide range of plants and animals. Their aim is to provide detailed research on forestry companies and their activities to NGOs and interested citizen's groups, and so support and empower those people affected by bad practices. Forests Monitor is a non-profit, non-governmental organisation.

Forests Monitor also contributes to the international and national forest policy formation through global processes such as the UNFF and regional forest law enforcement and governance (FLEG) processes such as the African FLEG and the ENA FLEG. The Concessions to Poverty report  co-produced between Forests Monitor and The Rainforest Foundation addresses these issues.

Activities

Forests Monitor is the lead organisation on the current project of monitoring forest exploitation in the Republic of Congo, working in partnership with REM (Resource Extraction Monitoring).

Forests Monitor along with UCL ExCiteS produced a beta version of a mobile application as part of their work in the Republic of Congo, which enables local communities to monitor forestry activities around their village.  Although the app released on the organisation's website is only a beta version, the licence is Apache 2 open source, and the aim is to encourage other organisations to use this method to assist people in protecting their local environment.

Forests Monitor supported the establishment of a charitable trust, Forests Monitor Charitable Trust. Forests Monitor Charitable Trust ceased activities in 2011. Forests Monitor Ltd (a non-profit organisation) continues with its work.

Forests Monitor has carried out many projects worldwide to investigate and raise awareness of the forest industry. Areas covered include:

Democratic Republic of Congo
Republic of Congo
Cameroon
Papua New Guinea
Malaysia
Solomon Islands
Siberia
Liberia

See also

 Illegal logging
The Rainforest Foundation
Resource Extraction Monitoring

References

External links
Forests Monitor website
Forests Monitor publications 
Resource Extraction Monitoring website
Rainforest Foundation website

Organizations established in 1993
Nature conservation organisations based in the United Kingdom
Non-profit organisations based in the United Kingdom
International forestry organizations
Forest certification
Anti-corruption agencies